Digitata is an electronic rock band from Minneapolis, Minnesota. The band has released three albums on independent record label Totally Gross National Product.

Digitata consists of Maggie Morrison on vocals, Ryan Olson on sequencer and Drew Christopherson on drums. Maggie Morrison is also a member of Gayngs and Lookbook. In 2010, City Pages praised her as "Best Female Vocalist" of the year. Olson and Christopherson are also part of the group Mel Gibson and the Pants.

URB described Digitata's music as "quirky and synth heavy with futuristic programming full of laptop tricks and emotionally captivating vocals." The band's style has been compared to as Morcheeba, Portishead, and Massive Attack.

Discography

Albums
 Sexually Transmitted Emotions (2005)
 II Daggers (2007)
 Art Work Pays (2009)

References

External links
 Digitata on Totally Gross National Product
 Digitata on Last.fm
 

Electronic music groups from Minnesota
Rock music groups from Minnesota
American electronic rock musical groups